Sunamganj-3 is a constituency represented in the Jatiya Sangsad (National Parliament) of Bangladesh since 2008 by M. A. Mannan of the Awami League.

Boundaries 
The constituency encompasses Shantiganj and Jagannathpur upazilas.

History 
The constituency was created in 1984 from a Sylhet constituency when the former Sylhet District was split into four districts: Sunamganj, Sylhet, Moulvibazar, and Habiganj.

Members of Parliament

Elections

Elections in the 2010s

Elections in the 2000s 

Abdus Samad Azad died in April 2005. Islami Oikya Jote leader Shahinur Pasha Chowdhury was elected in a July 2005 by-election. He defeated Awami League candidate M. A. Mannan, Jatiya Party (Ershad) candidate Syed Ali Ahmed, independent candidate M. Nazrul Islam, and five other lower-polling contenders.

Elections in the 1990s

References

External links
 

Parliamentary constituencies in Bangladesh
Sunamganj District